The 1924 Notre Dame Fighting Irish football team was an American football team that represented the University of Notre Dame as an independent during the 1924 college football season.  In their seventh season under head coach Knute Rockne, the Fighting Irish compiled a perfect 10–0 record, defeated Stanford in the 1925 Rose Bowl, and outscored opponents by a total of 285 to 54. The team was led by the legendary backfield known as the "Four Horsemen" consisting of quarterback Harry Stuhldreher, halfbacks Don Miller and Jim Crowley, and fullback Elmer Layden.

Notre Dame was ranked No. 1 in the Dickinson System's contemporary final ratings in the system's first year of existence. In 1926 the team was retroactively awarded the Rissman Trophy for this ranking.

In later analyses, Notre Dame was rated as the consensus 1924 national champion by the Berryman QPRS system, Billingsley Report, Boand System, College Football Researchers Association, Helms Athletic Foundation, Houlgate System, National Championship Foundation, Poling System, and Jeff Sagarin.

Three of the Four Horsemen, Stuhldreher, Crowley, and Layden, were consensus first-team picks on the 1924 All-America college football team. Other notable players included tackle Joe Bach and center Adam Walsh. The Four Horsemen, Walsh, and coach Rockne were all later inducted into the College Football Hall of Fame.

The 1925 Rose Bowl was Notre Dame's last bowl appearance until the 1969 season. The Fighting Irish played their home games at Cartier Field.

Schedule

Personnel

Depth chart
The following chart provides a visual depiction of Notre Dame's lineup during the 1924 season with games started at the position reflected in parenthesis. The chart mimics a Notre Dame Box on offense.

Line

Backfield

Subs

References

Notre Dame
Notre Dame Fighting Irish football seasons
College football national champions
Rose Bowl champion seasons
College football undefeated seasons
Notre Dame Fighting Irish football